Morning Better Last! is a compilation album released in September 2003. It brings together three tapes recorded by David Longstreth in the period 2001 to 2002. A year later they were compiled and released by States Rights Records on CD-R and as a digital download from iTunes. The album features guest appearances by Hank Miller, Liz Tung and Lucy Greene.

Both "After Santa Monica Boulevard" and "Dahlonegabhama" were reused for the song "Tour Along The Potomac" on The Getty Address, while "Here Comes The Summer King" is an up-tempo version of "Three Brown Finches" on The Glad Fact. In 2006, Longstreth commented on the material, explaining that the record "is like 1/40th of a whole bunch of four track recordings I made in 2002".

Track listing

References

2003 albums
Dirty Projectors albums
States Rights Records albums
Albums produced by David Longstreth